The Chinese mole shrew (Anourosorex squamipes) is one of four species of  Asian mole shrew in the genus Anourosorex.

Despite the name, it is found not only in China but also in northeast India, Myanmar, Thailand, and Vietnam. Like all other species of the genus Anourosorex, the Chinese mole shrew is fossorial, and is found in montane forests. In 2006, the Centers for Disease Control reported this species can carry a version of the hantavirus, which is genetically distinct from rodent hantavirus and new to science.

References
 Smith, A.T and Xie, Y. 2008. A guide to the mammals of China. Princeton University Press, New Jersey. 

Anourosorex
Mammals described in 1872
Mammals of China
Mammals of India
Mammals of Laos
Mammals of Myanmar
Mammals of Thailand
Mammals of Vietnam
Taxonomy articles created by Polbot